Southlake is a city located predominantly in Tarrant County with minor areas extending into Denton County in the U.S. state of Texas. Southlake is a suburb of Dallas/Fort Worth. As of the 2019 census estimate it had a population of 32,376.

History
The Southlake area was settled in the 1840s, but was not incorporated as Southlake until 1956, four years after the construction of Grapevine Lake was completed. Before incorporation, the settlements of Whites Chapel, Dove, Union Church and Jellico made up present day Southlake. The area remained rural until the completion of the DFW International Airport in the 1970s. Due to the close proximity to the airport, Southlake became a boom-burb throughout the 1980s, 1990s and 2000s.

Geography
Southlake is located at  (32.946678, −97.145230).

It is in proximity to Dallas–Fort Worth International Airport.

Demographics

2020 census

As of the 2020 United States census, there were 31,265 people, 9,323 households, and 8,398 families residing in the city.

2019
As of 2019, there was 32,376 people, 9,192 households, and over 5,958 families residing in the city. The population density was 983.0 people per square mile (379.6/km2). There are 6,614 housing units at an average density of 302.1 per square mile (116.7/km2). The ethnic composition of the population of Southlake is composed of 25,554 White residents (78.9%), 5,148 Asian residents (15.9%), 2,072 Hispanic residents (6.4%), 550 Black residents (1.7%), and 809 from two or more races. There were 6,414 households, out of which 60.5% had children under the age of 18 living with them, 88.0% were married couples living together, 3.5% had a single householder with no spouse present, and 7.1% were non-families. 5.4% of all households were made up of individuals, and 1.2% had someone living alone who was 65 years of age or older. The average household size was 3.35 and the average family size was 3.48. The average listing price for homes for sale in Southlake was $883,109 for the week ending Jan 8. 3,997 of the 6,602 occupied houses have nine or more rooms. 4,660 of the occupied houses have four or more bedrooms. 3,342 of the 6,602 occupied houses have two cars. 2,348 of these houses have three or more cars.

In the city, 37.1% of the population was under the age of 18, 3.9% from 18 to 24, 30.2% from 25 to 44, 25.7% from 45 to 64, and 3.1% who were 65 years of age or older. The median age was 37 years. For every 100 females, there were 100.6 males. For every 100 females age 18 and over, there were 98.0 males.

According to a 2019 estimate, the median income for a household in the city was in excess of $240,248, higher than any other city in the DFW Metroplex, and the median income for a family was $176,259. The mean household income for Southlake is $216,393. Males had a median income of $100,000 versus $46,042 for females. The per capita income for the city was $47,597. As of 2010, 43% of homes had an income of more than $200,000. About 1.3% of families and 1.8% of the population were below the poverty line, including 2.0% of those under age 18 and 2.1% of those age 65 or over.

Economy
Sabre Holdings, an S&P 500 company, is headquartered in Southlake in the Solana business park. Industrial businesses include gasoline storage and distribution and concrete works on the east side of town off Highway 114 near DFW Airport.

Southlake is well known for its Southlake Town Square project, a shopping center located on State Highway 114 and Southlake Boulevard. A plan was approved in March 2005 that allowed the Town Square's area to be doubled. The new additions to Town Square were completed in the summer of 2006, making it one of the most popular shopping centers in the Metroplex.

Top employers
According to Southlake's 2021 Annual Comprehensive Financial Report, the top employers in the city are:

Government

Incorporated in 1956, the City of Southlake's home rule charter was approved by voters on April 4, 1987, operating under a Council-Manager form of government.  Services provided by the City under general governmental functions include public events, public safety, planning and development, engineering, street maintenance, parks operation and maintenance, recreation, library services, and general administrative services. According to the city's 2013–2014 Comprehensive Annual Financial Report, the city's various funds had $104.2 million in revenues, $79.6 million in expenditures, $678.6 million in total assets, $182.1 million in total liabilities, and $108.8 million in cash and investments.

Education

The vast majority of Southlake is in the Carroll Independent School District. This school district contains the following schools:

Elementary: 
 Carroll Elementary School
 Old Union Elementary School
 Rockenbaugh Elementary School
 Walnut Grove Elementary School
 Johnson Elementary School

Intermediate:
 Eubanks Intermediate School
 Durham Intermediate School

Middle:
 Dawson Middle School
 Carroll Middle School

High schools:
 Carroll High School (grades 9–10)
 Carroll Sr. High School (grades 11–12)

All Carroll ISD schools share the logo and mascot of the dragon. The school district is currently ranked by the Texas Education Agency as the largest all exemplary school district in the state.

The Denton County portions of the city are in the Northwest Independent School District, while the extreme western portions are in the Keller Independent School District, and extreme eastern portions are in the Grapevine-Colleyville Independent School District.  As of the 2013–2014 school year, any residents of the city of Southlake that lives outside of the Carroll ISD boundaries are allowed to attend a Carroll ISD school, if they apply through the school district.  All of the district's schools are listed as "Exemplary" by Texas Education Association standards.

Sections in GCISD are zoned to: Cannon Elementary School, Grapevine Middle School, and Grapevine High School.

A number of private schools are also located in Southlake, among them:
 The Clariden School (Pre-K–12th grades Project-Based Learning)
 Fusion Academy Southlake (Middle and High School national chain)
 Southlake Montessori (Elementary)
The King's University

Transportation 
There is no bus or other public transport within city limits. The nearest train station is Grapevine-Main Street station at around  distance from the town center.

Airport
 Dallas/Fort Worth International Airport

Highways
  Texas 26
  Texas 114
  FM 1709
  FM 1938

Notable people

 Terry Bradshaw, professional football player
 John Burkett, professional baseball player
 Ruth Buzzi, actress and comedian
 Giovanni Capriglione, Republican politician
 Frank Cornish, professional football player
 Chase Daniel, professional football player
 Jon Daniels, professional baseball general manager
 Riley Dodge, college football player
 Greg Ellis, professional football player
 Garrett Hartley, professional football player
 Hailey Hernandez, olympic diver
 Ken Hill, professional baseball player
 Kenny Hill Jr., college football quarterback
 Julius Jones, professional football player
 Lindsay Jones, voice actor, Internet personality
 Dana Loesch, conservative political activist and commentator
 Russell Maryland, professional football player
 Mark McLemore, professional baseball player
 David Murphy, professional baseball player
 Terrence Newman, professional football player
 Darren Oliver, professional baseball player
 Hudson Potts, professional baseball player
 J. Paul Raines, CEO of GameStop
 Rory Sabbatini, professional golfer
 Sam Schwartzstein, college football player
 Marcus Spears, professional football player
 Ross Stripling, professional baseball player
 Pat Summerall, professional football player, sports announcer
 Tony Tolbert, professional football player
 DeMarcus Ware, professional football player
 Yang Yong-eun, professional golfer

Sister Cities
Southlake Sister Cities is a non-profit organization belonging to Sister Cities International and maintains a relationship with 2 sister cities: Tome, Japan and Wuzhong, China. These relationships consist of student exchange programs as well as adult delegations between the cities.

References

External links

 City of Southlake official website
 Southlake Chamber of Commerce
 The Southlake Journal newspaper
 Southlake Style, lifestyle magazine
 Southlake community website, OurGreatCity.com
 Southlake Town Square
 Visit Southlake Texas

Dallas–Fort Worth metroplex
Cities in Tarrant County, Texas
Cities in Denton County, Texas
Cities in Texas
1956 establishments in Texas
Populated places established in 1956